Somorrostro Beach is one of the beaches in Barcelona, Catalonia, Spain. It is located between Hospital del Mar and Marina Street, in the far east area of the Barceloneta neighborhood, in the Ciutat Vella district. The Somorrostro name was forgotten and the beach became one of the most popular in the city. It was not until 2010, Somorrostro beach got its original name back.

History 
During the 19th century and part of the 20th century, the beach, and much of the neighboring beach areas was occupied by a shanty town, inhabited by 15,000 people living in 2,000 slums. Known during this time as a Romani community. It was not until the 1966 visit of Spanish caudillo Francisco Franco that the slum removal began. Most of these slums were pulled down between the 1960s and 1980s.

Famous gypsy flamenco dancers Carmen Amaya and Antoñita Singla were born in that neighborhood. Los Tarantos, an academy award-nominated film about flamenco starring Amaya, was filmed there in 1963.

Gallery

References

Beaches of Barcelona
Beaches of Catalonia